Scientific Memoirs, Selected from the Transactions of Foreign Academies of science and Learned Societies and from Foreign Journals was a series of books edited and published by Richard Taylor (1781–1858) in London between 1837 and 1852.

After 1852 the publication continued in two series: Natural Philosophy, edited by J. Tyndall and William Francis; and, Natural history, edited by Arthur Henfrey and Thomas Henry Huxley.

Volume 3 (1843) is noteworthy because it contained Ada Lovelace's notes appended to her translation of Luigi Federico Menabrea's article.

Some volumes have been reprinted by Johnson Reprint Corp. New York in 1966.

Further reading 
 Richard Taylor, 1781–1858 at the Darwin Correspondence Online Database
 Niels Bohr Library Book Catalog
 Scientific memoirs, selected from the transactions of foreign academies of science, and from foreign journals. Natural history at WorldCat
 Volumes 1-4 on Wikisource

References

Science books